Moravskoslezský Kočov is a municipality in Bruntál District in the Moravian-Silesian Region of the Czech Republic. It has about 600 inhabitants.

Administrative parts
The municipality is made up of villages of Moravský Kočov and Slezský Kočov.

References

External links

 

Villages in Bruntál District